William Grimston (1750–1814) was an English politician. From 1797 he was known as William Bucknall.

Life
He was the second son of James Grimston, 2nd Viscount Grimston and his wife Mary Bucknall, and the younger brother of James Grimston, 3rd Viscount Grimston. He was born at Gorhambury in Hertfordshire, and was educated at Eton College and Christ's College, Cambridge, matriculating in 1768 and graduating M.A. in 1770.

Grimston was admitted to Lincoln's Inn in 1767. He generally supported the ministry. In the 1790 general election, he stepped aside, in favour of John Calvert.

On 21 January 1797, Grimston changed his surname to Bucknall, fulfilling a condition in the will of his uncle John Askell Bucknall. He died on 25 April 1814.

Family

Grimston married in 1783 Sophia Hoare, daughter of Richard Hoare of Boreham, Essex, a banker and grandson of Richard Hoare (1648–1719), and of Susanna Cecilia Dingley (1743–1795). They had a daughter, Sophia Askell (1784–1859), who had a court position as woman of the bedchamber to Adelaide of Saxe-Meiningen. She married in 1804 the Honorable Berkeley Paget, a younger son of Henry Paget, 1st Earl of Uxbridge, by whom she had seven children. The other child of the marriage, John, died an infant.

Notes

1750 births
1814 deaths
Members of the Parliament of Great Britain for English constituencies
British MPs 1784–1790
British MPs 1790–1796
Members of Lincoln's Inn
People educated at Eton College
Alumni of Christ's College, Cambridge
Younger sons of viscounts